Nathan Patterson may refer to:

Nathan Patterson (baseball) (born 1996), American baseball player
Nathan Patterson (footballer) (born 2001), Scottish footballer